Ministry of Power may refer to:

 Ministry of Power (India)
 Ministry of Power (West Bengal), India
 Ministry of Power (United Kingdom)
 Ministry of Power and Energy, Sri Lanka